A Pill for Loneliness is the sixth studio album by City and Colour. It was released on 4 October 2019 through frontman Dallas Green's own record label, Still Records. The lead single, "Astronaut", was released on 3 June 2019, with the album being officially announced on 15 August 2019. The release was City and Colour's fourth consecutive studio album to reach No. 1 on the Canadian Albums Chart.

The album was a Juno Award nominee for Adult Alternative Album of the Year at the Juno Awards of 2020.

Track listing

Charts

References

2019 albums
City and Colour albums
Albums produced by Jacquire King